Le Vernet is a commune in the Alpes-de-Haute-Provence department, and in the region of Provence-Alpes-Côte d'Azur, in southeastern France.

The name of its inhabitants is Vernetois or Vernetiers.

Geography

The village of Le Vernet is located in the  Valley at  altitude. Its population does not exceed 100 permanent residents, but it is often more than doubled each summer and winter, when the municipality becomes the place of departure for sightseeing excursions, particularly in the  Valley, and a place of departure for the nearby ski stations (Grand-Puy,  and Chabanon).

The municipality has two main villages, Haut-Vernet, perched high and Bas-Vernet below.

Geology
During the two last major glaciations, the Riss glaciation and the Würm glaciation, a glacier was present in the upper part of the Riou de la Montagne Valley. The diffluence was reproduced during the Würm period, but did not reach the territory of Vernet.

Relief

Environment
The commune comprises  of woods and forests.

Transport

Natural and technological hazards

None of the 200 communes of the Department is in the zero seismic risk zone. The Canton of Seyne, to which Le Vernet belongs, is in zone 1b (low seismicity) determined by the 1991 classification, based on the historical earthquakes, and in zone 4 (medium risk) according to the probabilistic classification EC8 of 2011. The municipality of Le Vernet is also exposed to four other natural hazards:

Avalanche
Forest fire
Flooding
Ground movement

The commune of Le Vernet is more exposed to a risk of technological origin, that of transport of dangerous goods by road. The  RD 900 (the former ) can be used for the road transport of dangerous goods.

A predictable natural  (PPR) doesn't exist for the commune and  does not exist either.

History remembers two earthquakes to have been strongly felt in the town. They exceeded a macro-seismic intensity level V on the MSK scale (sleepers awake, falling objects). The specified intensities are those felt in the town, the intensity can be stronger at the epicentre:

The earthquake of 22 March 1949 had an intensity level V, and with Le Lauzet at the epicentre
The earthquake of 31 October 1997 had an intensity level V, and with Prads-Haute-Bléone at the epicentre

Toponymy
According to the Fénie couple, the name of Le Vernet refers to alder.

History
During antiquity, the Bodiontiques (Bodiontici) lived in the Bléone Valley, and were therefore the Gallic people who lived in the current municipality of Vernet. The Bodiontiques, who were defeated by Augustus at the same time as other peoples present on the Tropaeum Alpium (before 14 BC), are attached to the province of Alpes Maritimae at its inception.

The town appears for the first time in charters in the 11th century. The Priory of Saint-Clément was under the Abbey of Saint-Victor in Marseille, via the Priory of Chaudol (now in La Javie). The priory decided the questes and the taille, the lord decided the cavalcade and the albergue.

In the Middle Ages, the great road of Digne to Seyne passed, descending from the Col du Labouret, by Haut-Vernet, without following the Bès Valley.

In 1602, the trial exploitation of a vein of copper was cut short, the deposit actually being very poor. As early as 1604, the owners couldn't pay the workers, some were sent to Villevieille and Verdaches. These mines were given a new concession in 1614, without which their operation would never have restarted.

As with many communes of the Department, Le Vernet acquired schools well before the Jules Ferry laws: In 1863, it had one each at Haut-Vernet and Bas-Vernet, which provide a primary education for boys. While the Falloux Laws of 1851 required the opening of a girls school for communes with more than 800 inhabitants, and the first  of 1867 lowered the threshold to 500 inhabitants, Le Vernet nevertheless opened a school for girls, ahead of the laws. The commune took advantage of subsidies from the second Duruy Law in 1877 to build a new school at Haut-Vernet.

On 24 March 2015, Germanwings Flight 9525, an Airbus A320 flying from Barcelona to Düsseldorf, crashed in the mountains of the neighboring commune of Prads-Haute-Bléone, near to the border with Le Vernet.

Politics and administration

Population and society

Demography

In 2017, Le Vernet had 123 inhabitants. From the 21st century, communes with less than 10,000 inhabitants have a census held every five years (2004, 2009 and 2014, etc. for the Vernet). Since 2004, the other figures are estimates.

The demographic history of Le Vernet, after the depopulation of the 14th and 15th centuries and long movement of growth until the beginning of the 19th century, is marked by a period of 'spread' where the population remains stable at a high level. This period lasts from 1806 to 1846. The  then caused a rapid decline in population, most importantly a long-term movement. Between 1911 and 1921, the municipality records the loss of more than half of its population (relative to the historic maximum). The downward movement is interrupted only in the 1980s. Since then, the population has doubled.

Education

It has a primary school, consisting of 9 students.

Religion
The Catholic parish of Le Vernet depends on the Diocese of Digne, Riez and Sisteron.

Local culture and heritage

Sites and monuments
In Bas-Vernet, the parish church of Sainte-Marthe dates from the 19th century.

At Haut-Vernet, the Saint-Martin Church is also from the 19th century.

The chapel of Saint-Pancrace, isolated above Haut-Vernet, is the old parish church. Ruined by the European wars of religion, it was rebuilt, and its roof was repaired again in the 20th century.

The Oratory of Saint-Roch

Notable people
Gaspard Laurent Bayle, physician to Napoleon
 has a monument at the

Heraldry

See also
Communes of the Alpes-de-Haute-Provence department

Bibliography

 (BnF no. FRBNF35450017h)

References

External links

Le Vernet on the website of the French National Geographic Institute (Archived)

Communes of Alpes-de-Haute-Provence